Presidential elections were held in El Salvador in January 1899. Provisional president General Tomás Regalado was the only candidate. No results were posted.

Results

References

El Salvador
1890s in El Salvador
Election and referendum articles with incomplete results
Presidential elections in El Salvador
Single-candidate elections